The men's 200 metre breaststroke competition of the swimming events at the 1999 Pan American Games took place on 5 August at the Pan Am Pool. The last Pan American Games champion was Seth Van Neerden of US.

This race consisted of four lengths of the pool, all in breaststroke.

Results
All times are in minutes and seconds.

Heats
The first round was held on August 5.

B Final 
The B final was held on August 5.

A Final 
The A final was held on August 5.

References

Swimming at the 1999 Pan American Games